Wally Savor (born 21 June 1959) is an Australian former international soccer player who played professionally as a defender or midfielder for Sydney Croatia. He played 23 times for the Australia men's national soccer team between 1984 and 1989.

Early life
Savor was born in Italy to parents of Croatian ancestry and arrived in Australia as a child.

Playing career
Savor began his senior career for Sydney Croatia in the New South Wales State League, playing for the club between 1978 and 1980. 

In 1981, Savor played for Riverwood, before returning to Sydney Croatia. In 1984, Sydney Croatia joined the National Soccer League (NSL). Between 1984 and 1991, Savor played 165 times in the NSL for Sydney Croatia.

In November 1984, Savor made his debut for Australia against China in Beijing. 

Savor was a late withdrawal from Australia's 1988 Summer Olympics team when he injured his right knee in the 1988 NSL grand final.

Honours
Sydney Croatia

NSL Cup: 1987

Individual
Soccer Australia Hall of Fame: 2003

References

1959 births
Living people
Australian soccer players
Australia international soccer players
Association football defenders
Association football midfielders
Australian people of Croatian descent
Italian emigrants to Australia
Sydney United 58 FC players
National Soccer League (Australia) players